Burgos Club de Fútbol Promesas, formerly Club Deportivo Burgos Promesas 2000, is a Spanish football team based in Burgos, in the autonomous community of Castile and León. Founded in 2000, it is the reserve team of Burgos CF and plays in Segunda Federación – Group 1, holding home matches at Ciudad Deportiva de Castañares.

History

On 4 May 2020, Burgos Promesas reached an agreement with Burgos CF to become their reserve team until 2034. The club was then renamed to Burgos CF Promesas.

Season to season
As an independent club

As a reserve team of Burgos CF

2 seasons in Segunda Federación
8 seasons in Tercera División

Current squad

References

External links
Official website 
Futbolme team profile 
Soccerway team profile
Dirfutbol team profile 

Football clubs in Castile and León
Association football clubs established in 2000
Sport in Burgos
2000 establishments in Spain
Spanish reserve football teams
Burgos CF